Pyramimonadophyceae is a class of green algae in the division Chlorophyta.

References

 
Green algae classes